The Chevin is a hill in West Yorkshire, England

The Chevin may also refer to :
The Chevin (band), an English post-punk revival band, based in Leeds, formed in 2010
The Chevin, Derbyshire, a hill in England

See also
Chevin, a synonym for the European chub